Anti-unification is the process of constructing a generalization common to two given symbolic expressions. As in unification, several frameworks are distinguished depending on which expressions (also called terms) are allowed, and which expressions are considered equal. If variables representing functions are allowed in an expression, the process is called "higher-order anti-unification", otherwise "first-order anti-unification". If the generalization is required to have an instance literally equal to each input expression, the process is called "syntactical anti-unification", otherwise "E-anti-unification", or "anti-unification modulo theory".

An anti-unification algorithm should compute for given expressions a complete and minimal generalization set, that is, a set covering all generalizations and containing no redundant members, respectively. Depending on the framework, a complete and minimal generalization set may have one, finitely many, or possibly infinitely many members, or may not exist at all; it cannot be empty, since a trivial generalization exists in any case. For first-order syntactical anti-unification, Gordon Plotkin gave an algorithm that computes a complete and minimal singleton generalization set containing the so-called "least general generalization" (lgg).

Anti-unification should not be confused with dis-unification. The latter means the process of solving systems of inequations, that is of finding values for the variables such that all given inequations are satisfied. This task is quite different from finding generalizations.

Prerequisites

Formally, an anti-unification approach presupposes 
 An infinite set V of variables. For higher-order anti-unification, it is convenient to choose V disjoint from the set of lambda-term bound variables.
 A set T of terms such that V ⊆ T. For first-order and higher-order anti-unification, T is usually the set of first-order terms (terms built from variable and function symbols) and lambda terms (terms containing some higher-order variables), respectively.
If there is no background knowledge at all, then only literally, or syntactically, identical terms are considered equal.

First-order term

Given a set  of variable symbols, a set  of constant symbols and sets  of -ary function symbols, also called operator symbols, for each natural number , the set of (unsorted first-order) terms  is recursively defined to be the smallest set with the following properties:
 every variable symbol is a term: V ⊆ T,
 every constant symbol is a term: C ⊆ T,
 from every n terms t1,...,tn, and every n-ary function symbol f ∈ Fn, a larger term  can be built.
For example, if x ∈ V is a variable symbol, 1 ∈ C is a constant symbol, and add ∈ F2 is a binary function symbol, then x ∈ T, 1 ∈ T, and (hence) add(x,1) ∈ T by the first, second, and third term building rule, respectively. The latter term is usually written as x+1, using Infix notation and the more common operator symbol + for convenience.

Higher-order term

Substitution

The result  of applying a substitution  to a term  is called an instance of that term .
As a first-order example, applying the substitution  to the term 
{|
|-
|| 
|| 
|| 
|| 
||  
|| yields 
|-
|| 
|| 
|| 
|| 
|| 
|| .
|}

Generalization, specialization

For example,  is more general than  if  is commutative, since then .

If  is literal (syntactic) identity of terms, a term may be both more general and more special than another one only if both terms differ just in their variable names, not in their syntactic structure; such terms are called variants, or renamings of each other.
The latter term is hence properly more special than the former one.

Anti-unification problem, generalization set

An anti-unification problem is a pair  of terms.
For a given anti-unification problem, a set  of anti-unifiers is called complete if each generalization subsumes some term ; the set  is called minimal if none of its members subsumes another one.

First-order syntactical anti-unification 

In this framework, each anti-unification problem  has a complete, and obviously minimal, singleton solution set . 

Plotkin has given an algorithm to compute the lgg of two given terms.
It presupposes an injective mapping , that is, a mapping assigning each pair  of terms an own variable , such that no two pairs share the same variable.

The algorithm consists of two rules:

{| 
|-
| align="right" | 
| 
| 
|-
| align="right" | 
| 
| 
| align="right" | if previous rule not applicable
|}

For example, ; this least general generalization reflects the common property of both inputs of being square numbers.

Plotkin used his algorithm to compute the "relative least general generalization (rlgg)" of two clause sets in first-order logic, which was the basis of the Golem approach to inductive logic programming.

First-order anti-unification modulo theory

 Software.

Equational theories
One associative and commutative operation: ; 
Commutative theories: 
Free monoids: 
Regular congruence classes: ; 
A-, C-, AC-, ACU-theories with ordered sorts: 
Purely idempotent theories:

First-order sorted anti-unification
Taxonomic sorts: ; ; 
Feature terms: 

A-, C-, AC-, ACU-theories with ordered sorts: see above

Nominal anti-unification
 Baumgartner, Alexander; Kutsia, Temur; Levy, Jordi; Villaret, Mateu (Jun 2013). Nominal Anti-Unification. Proc. RTA 2015. Vol. 36 of LIPIcs. Schloss Dagstuhl, 57-73. Software.

Applications
 Program analysis: ; 
 Code factoring: 
 Induction proving: 
 Information Extraction: 
 Case-based reasoning: 
 Program synthesis: The idea of generalizing terms with respect to an equational theory can be traced back to Manna and Waldinger (1978, 1980) who desired to apply it in program synthesis. In section "Generalization", they suggest (on p. 119 of the 1980 article) to generalize reverse(l) and reverse(tail(l))<>[head(l)] to obtain reverse(l')<>m' . This generalization is only possible if the background equation u<>[]=u is considered.
  — preprint of the 1980 article
 
 Natural language processing:

Higher-order anti-unification

Calculus of constructions: 
 Simply-typed lambda calculus (Input: Terms in the eta-long beta-normal form. Output:  higher-order patterns): Baumgartner, Alexander; Kutsia, Temur; Levy, Jordi; Villaret, Mateu (Jun 2013). A Variant of Higher-Order Anti-Unification. Proc. RTA 2013. Vol. 21 of LIPIcs. Schloss Dagstuhl, 113-127. Software.
Simply-typed lambda calculus (Input: Terms in the eta-long beta-normal form. Output: Various fragments of the simply-typed lambda calculus including patterns): 
 Restricted Higher-Order Substitutions:  ;

Notes

References 

Inductive logic programming
Automated theorem proving
Logic in computer science
Unification (computer science)